Staley is an unincorporated community in Champaign County, Illinois, United States. Staley is located along Illinois Route 10 near the western border of Champaign.

References

Unincorporated communities in Champaign County, Illinois
Unincorporated communities in Illinois